Awam Amkpa is a professor of drama, film and social and cultural analysis at New York University in New York and Abu Dhabi. Actor, playwright, director of stage plays, films and curator of visual arts, Awam Amkpa is a Nigerian-American.

Background
Currently a professor of Drama and Cultural Theory at the departments of Drama, Tisch School of the Arts and Social and Cultural Analysis, Faculty of Arts and Sciences at New York University. He received his B.A. in Dramatic Arts from Obafemi Awolowo University, Ile-Ife, Nigeria where he studied under the tutelage of Wole Soyinka, his M.A. in Drama from Ahmadu Bello University, Zaria, Nigeria, and his Ph.D. from University of Bristol, Bristol, England.

Career
Dr. Amkpa is currently a professor of Drama at New York University and in Social and Cultural Analysis/Africana studies at New York University.  He has also taught at Mount Holyoke College. He is a theatre scholar and practitioner-director, playwright and actor, film maker and curator of visual and performing arts.

Books
Theatre and Postcolonial Desires'. New York: Routledge, 2003.
ReSignifications: European Blackamoors, Africana Readings. Edited catalogue published by Postcart, Rome, Italy. 2016
Africa: See You, See Me. Edited catalogue, Africa.Cont, Lisboa. 2013

Filmography
Truly, Madly, Deeply, 1991 - a ghost
Director/Editor, ‘Accra: A Pan-African Rupture’ 75 mins

Director/Editor, ‘A Very Very Short Story of Nollywood’ 15 mins
Produced by Manthia Diawara. 2008

Director, ‘Women of Agbogloshi’ 12 mins- short documentary
on Muslim women in Accra. 2007

Director, ‘Voices Against Aids’ 5 mins ‘Hip-Life’ music video
shot and broadcast in Ghana for the West African Aids
Federation. 2007

Assistant Director, Conakry Kas, directed by Manthia Diawara
2006

Assistant Director, Bamako Sigi-Kan, directed by Manthia Diawara. 2005

Director, Editor, Wazobia! Feature film written and produced by Tess Onwueme. 2005

Curatorial Practices
'Africa: Significaciones' at Centro Provincial de artes Plasticas y Diseño, Havana, Cuba. 2017
'ReSignifications: European Blackamoors, Africana Readings.' at Museo Bardini, Villa La Pietra and Galleria Biagiotti, Florence, Italy. 2015
'Africa: See You, See Me' in Beijing and Macau China; Rome and Florence, Italy, Dakar, Senegal and Lagos, Nigeria. 2011-2013
Annual Highlife Music Festival, Accra, Ghana. 2006-2009
Kofi Ghanaba Audi-Visual Archives, Medie-Accra, Ghana 2007-2010

References

External links
 

Nigerian dramatists and playwrights
Nigerian male film actors
Mount Holyoke College faculty
New York University faculty
Living people
Year of birth missing (living people)
Place of birth missing (living people)
Obafemi Awolowo University alumni
Ahmadu Bello University alumni